The Pays Noir (French, 'black country') refers to a region of Belgium, centered on Charleroi in the province of Hainaut in Wallonia so named for the geological presence of coal. In the 19th century the region rapidly industrialised first with coal mines, then with related industries such as steel manufacture and glass production.

Description
The region, centred on Charleroi, also known as the Pays de Charleroi includes the communes of Aiseau-Presles, Charleroi, Châtelet, Courcelles, Farciennes, Fleurus, Fontaine-l'Évêque, Gerpinnes, Les Bons Villers and Pont-à-Celles.

In the west, the Pays Noir borders the Centre-region around the town of La Louvière. Geologically, the region - as well as the other coal bearing areas in Belgium - lies on the northern edge of the Rhenish Massif.

See also

Sillon industriel, the industrial valley of Belgium, the western part of which lies in the Pays Noir
Borinage
Black Country, a similar early industrial region in the English Midlands

Literature

References

Geography of Charleroi
Geography of Hainaut (province)
Regions of Wallonia
Coal mining regions in Belgium
Areas of Belgium